Patrícia Mbengani Bravo Mamona  (born 21 November 1988) is a Portuguese triple jumper of Angolan descent. She won the gold medal at the 2016 European Athletics Championships in Amsterdam, Netherlands. This was her first-ever major senior title and second European Championships medal, after a silver at the 2012 championships. In 2021 she won the gold medal at the European Indoor Championships in Toruń, Poland after recovering for 4 weeks from COVID-19. At the 2020 Tokyo Olympics, she won the silver medal with a national record of 15.01 m. At club level, she represents Sporting CP.

Mamona attended Clemson University and won two NCAA Championships in women's triple jump (2010, 2011).

International competitions

References

External links
 World Athletics profile.

1988 births
Living people
Portuguese female triple jumpers
Portuguese female long jumpers
Athletes from Lisbon
Athletes (track and field) at the 2012 Summer Olympics
Athletes (track and field) at the 2016 Summer Olympics
Olympic athletes of Portugal
European Athletics Championships medalists
World Athletics Championships athletes for Portugal
Universiade medalists in athletics (track and field)
Portuguese sportspeople of Angolan descent
Black Portuguese sportspeople
Universiade silver medalists for Portugal
Athletes (track and field) at the 2018 Mediterranean Games
Medalists at the 2011 Summer Universiade
Mediterranean Games competitors for Portugal
European Athletics Indoor Championships winners
Athletes (track and field) at the 2020 Summer Olympics
Medalists at the 2020 Summer Olympics
Olympic silver medalists for Portugal
Olympic silver medalists in athletics (track and field)
Clemson Tigers women's track and field athletes
Competitors at the 2011 Summer Universiade